Shoaymat-e Yek (also Romanized as Sho‘aymaţ-e Yek; also known as Majīdābād, Sha‘mīţ, Sho‘aimate Bavi, Sho‘amyaţ-e Yek, and Sho‘eymeţ-e Bāvī) is a village in Anaqcheh Rural District, in the Central District of Ahvaz County, Khuzestan Province, Iran. At the 2006 census, its population was 57, in 11 families.

References 

Populated places in Ahvaz County